The position of the Head of the Karachay-Cherkess Republic (formerly known as the President of the Karachay-Cherkess Republic) is the highest office within the Government of the Karachay-Cherkess Republic in Russia. The Head is elected by citizens of Russia residing in the republic. Term of service is five years.

History 
After the restoration of the Karachay-Cherkess Autonomous Oblast in 1957 as part of the Stavropol Krai and until the spring of 1990, the Karachay-Cherkess Regional Committee of the CPSU played a leading role in its leadership. From 1988 to July 1991, Valentin Lesnichenko was the first secretary of the regional committee.

In March 1990 there was a sharp decline of the one-party system connected with the abolition of the Article 6 of the Soviet Constitution, which defined the "leading and guiding role" of the Communist Party in USSR politics. Since that time Russian regions began to act as the de facto parliamentary republics. As a result, the head of the regional Council (soviet) became the major official in the region. Since March 1979, Vladimir Khubiev has been the chairman of the Executive committee of the Council of People's Deputies of the Karachay-Cherkessia.

On 22 March 1990, Lesnichenko was uncontestedly elected Speaker of the Council of People's Deputies, the new composition of which was elected in March 1990. On the same day, Vladimir Khubiyev was re-elected chairman of the Executive committee.

On 3 December 1991, the Council adopted a decision to re-establish the separate Karachay Republic. However, on December 5, the session of the Council decided to conduct a plebiscite on the preservation of the unity of Karachay-Cherkessia. On 13 January 1992, Russian President Boris Yeltsin appointed Khubiyev Acting Head of Administration of Karachay-Cherkessia. In January 1993, the former regional Council was transformed into the Supreme Soviet and the Council of Ministers was created with Khubiev as chairman. As a result, the region was headed by Vladimir Khubiyev for almost 20 years, from 1979 to 1999.

In April–May 1999, the first presidential elections in Karachay-Cherkessia were held. In the second round, the former commander-in-chief of the Ground Forces, Vladimir Semyonov, was elected. He received 75% of the votes against Stanislav Derev's 18%, but the opposition did not recognize the results and challenged them in courts for six months.

List

Notes

References

External links
Russian republics

 
Politics of Karachay-Cherkessia
Karachay-Cherkessia